Darreh Kerdi (also Romanized as Darreh Kerdī; also known as Barz, Borz, Bowrz, and Burz) is a village in Raviz Rural District, Koshkuiyeh District, Rafsanjan County, Kerman Province, Iran. At the 2006 census, its population was 80, in 20 families.

References 

Populated places in Rafsanjan County